Middletown High School (MHS) is a small public high school located in Middletown, California, United States. It is the only comprehensive high school in the Middletown Unified School District.

Academics
MHS offers AP courses in English literature, calculus, environmental science, U.S. history, and Spanish language. It has an agriculture department, as well as nine ROP (vocational) courses.

MHS's graduation rate is 94.59%. 37.9% of the class of 2011 completed the college prep UC/CSU (a)-(g) requirements.

Extracurricular activities
Student groups and organizations include student government, Interact Club, Drama Club, Bible Club, Future Farmers of America, Junior Statesmen of America,and United States Academic Decathlon, 

Athletic activities include football, volleyball, cross country, cheerleading, soccer, basketball, wrestling, baseball, softball, track, tennis, and golf.

Demographics
Middletown High's student body is 72.8% white, 19.5% Hispanic or Latino, 2.5% of two or more races, 1.6% American Indian or Alaska Native, 1.4% Native Hawaiian or Pacific Islander, 1.0% black or African American, 0.8% Asian, and 0.6% Filipino. 37.0% of students are socioeconomically disadvantaged, while 5.6% are English learners.

References

External links
Middletown High School Official Website

Education in Lake County, California
Public high schools in California
Buildings and structures in Lake County, California
1919 establishments in California